The 1960 Missouri Tigers football team was an American football team that represented the University of Missouri in the Big Eight Conference (Big 8) during the 1960 NCAA University Division football season. The team compiled an 11–0 record (7–0 against Big 8 opponents), won the Big 8 championship, defeated Navy in the Orange Bowl, was ranked No. 5 in the final AP Poll, and outscored its opponents 295 to 93. Led by third-year head coach Dan Devine, the team played its home games at Memorial Stadium in Columbia, Missouri.

The 1960 season included one of the most famous games in the history of Missouri vs. Kansas rivalry. Missouri had won its first nine games and was top-ranked in the polls, but the visiting Jayhawks won 23–7. Kansas used an ineligible player, Bert Coan, in the game and the win was officially awarded to Missouri by the Big Eight Conference on December 8. The reversal brought Missouri's record to 11–0 instead of 10–1.

The team's statistical leaders included Mel West with 650 rushing yards and 650 yards of total offense, Ron Taylor with 302 passing yards, Danny LaRose with 151 receiving yards, and Donnie Smith with 78 point scored.

Schedule

References

Missouri
Missouri Tigers football seasons
Big Eight Conference football champion seasons
Orange Bowl champion seasons
College football undefeated seasons
Missouri Tigers football